Scythian lamb may refer to:

Vegetable Lamb of Tartary, legend
Cibotium barometz, plant
The Scythian Lamb, 2018 Japanese film based on the manga Hitsuji no Ki